Thomas Daniel (born June 17, 1985, in Schwarzach im Pongau) is a modern pentathlete from Austria. He is the first Austrian modern pentathlete to qualify for the Olympics for 24 years, and competed in the men's event at the 2012 Summer Olympics in London, where he finished in sixth place, missing out on the chance of winning the nation's first medal of the Games.

Daniel also spent his sporting career as an army soldier, and had won an individual gold medal at the 2008 CISM Modern Pentathlon Championships in Riga, Latvia.

References

External links
  (archived page from Pentathlon.org)

Austrian male modern pentathletes
1985 births
Living people
Olympic modern pentathletes of Austria
Modern pentathletes at the 2012 Summer Olympics
21st-century Austrian people